KLLK (1250 AM) is a radio station broadcasting a classic hits format, simulcasting KUKI 1400 AM Ukiah. Licensed to Willits, California, United States, the station serves the Fort Bragg-Ukiah area. The station is currently owned by Bicoastal Media Licenses, LLC.

References

External links

Classic hits radio stations in the United States
LLK